Stonebridge is a village in the English county of Norfolk. The village forms part of the civil parish of Wretham , which in turn falls within the district of Breckland.

References
 Ordnance Survey (1999). OS Explorer Map 229 - Thetford in the Brecks. .

External links

Villages in Norfolk
Breckland District